There are two rivers called Valea Râsului in Romania:
 Valea Râsului, a tributary of the Motru in Gorj County
 Valea Râsului, a tributary of the Râușor (Dâmbovița) in Argeș County